London Town may refer to:

Places
London or London Town, United Kingdom
Londontowne, Maryland, a census-designated place and site of the former London Town seaport, now operated as Historic London Town and Gardens

Film
London Town (1946 film), a British musical film
London Town (2016 film), an American musical film

Music
London Town (Kano album) (2007)
London Town (Wings album) (1978)
"London Town" (Wings song) (1978)
"London Town" (Bucks Fizz song) (1983)
"London Town", a song by Bellowhead from Burlesque

See also

London (disambiguation)